Adepeju Opeyemi Jaiyeoba (born November 1983) is a Nigerian social entrepreneur and activist who created the Brown Button Foundation as well as Mother's Delivery Kit which creates low cost health care options and delivery kits containing basic sterile supplies for expectant mothers in Nigeria.

Life
Jaiyeoba trained as a lawyer and attended Obafemi Awolowo University Ile-Ife. She also has background training in Business and Entrepreneurship from the University of Texas at Austin USA as well as the Coady International Institute, Canada.

Jaiyeoba's mission to reduce maternal and child mortality was as a result of the death of a close friend during childbirth in 2011 and reports of another. She found out that 145 women die in childbirth and 2,300 children die before reaching the age of five in Nigeria.

Jaiyeoba was mentioned by Barack Obama in his address in 2014 to the Young African Leaders Presidential Summit in Washington and was also hosted at the White House in 2015. In 2014, they started delivering birth kits having seen the damage that lack of sterile supplies such as rusty blades used for severing umbilical cords during childbirth can have. By 2015, they had distributed 8,000 kits and by 2017, 300,000.

In 2017 she gave a TEDx talk.

She has spoken at a number of local and international events and continues to inspire young people across Africa to action.

Awards
She is a White House Emerging Global Entrepreneur 
She is a PATH International Innovation Champion
2018 USADF and Citi Foundation Venture showcase winner 
Frost and Sullivan African Sterilized birth kit innovation award winner
 One of 2017 100 most inspiring women in Nigeria
2017 Crans Montana Young Leader of Tomorrow awardee
JCI top 10 Outstanding Young Persons of the World awardee 2017 
JCI top 10 Outstanding Young Person of Nigeria awardee 2017 
D-Prize awardee in Global Health 
2018 Unilever Young Entrepreneurs Awards Winner 
2014 Mandela Washington Fellow 
Fellow of the Unreasonable Institute
Women in Successful Careers (WISCAR) member
2015 Young Innovator of the World Innovation Summit for Health (WISH)
Africa's top 10 female entrepreneur for Diaspora Demo day
2015 YNaija top 10 most influential Nigerians under 40 (Advocacy) 
2015 Cordes Fellow.
Commonwealth Point of Light Award Winner 
HRH Prince of Wales Young Sustainability Entrepreneur Prize Winner in 2018.
Opportunity Desk June 2015 Young Person of the month.

Public speaking 
Jaiyeoba has been featured on various high level platforms. She spoke at the Africa Shared Value Summit in 2020; The Platform Nigeria - beyond politics in 2018; Social Media Week Lagos in 2018;

References

Living people
Nigerian women in business
1983 births
Nigerian women activists
Obafemi Awolowo University alumni
University of Texas Health Science Center at Houston alumni
Nigerian women lawyers
Yoruba businesspeople
Yoruba activists
Yoruba women in business
Yoruba legal professionals